Michael Ferguson ( – 24 September 2006) was an Irish Republican politician from Northern Ireland.  He served as a councillor on Lisburn City Council and as an MLA for Belfast West.

Politics and Life
'Michael was an imaginative and innovative activist who always looked to direct action. There really was no job too big or too small for him. When he and Louise moved to Poleglass, Michael's work in the community began in earnest. A classic example of an estate built for social control, Michael organised an escape. During their first summer there, Michael and Louise borrowed a bus from Queens University and each and every day took kids from a different cul-de-sac away on a daytrip to the seaside. He had talent for raising the profile of every issue he took on. His education remit was raised to a new level with his hard work and hard sell approach. Likewise with his various campaigns on housing, traffic calming, youth work and disability.'  “He shifted effortlessly from one campaign to another: opposing death drivers, demanding an end to anti-social behaviour, protecting victims of crime, campaigning for better housing, traffic calming and more provision for youth and people with disabilities. 

Ferguson was convicted in 1975 of firearms offences, kidnapping and bank robbery. He held a bank manager and his family hostage aimed at raising funds for the INLA.
Ferguson graduated from Queen's University Belfast in 1989 and became involved in politics. In 1989, Ferguson was elected as a Sinn Féin representative on Lisburn City Council. In 1996 he was an unsuccessful candidate in the Northern Ireland Forum election in Lagan Valley. In 2003, he was also elected to the Northern Ireland Assembly, to represent Belfast West.

Illness and death 
Ferguson died on 24 September 2006 from testicular cancer.  He had spoken about the illness to the Belfast-based Irish News, saying "Men are neglectful of their own health and do not visit their doctors."

Being Honoured 
Local supporters and community workers renamed the Poleglass Roundabout on Belfast’s Stewartstown Road in honour of Sinn Féin activist and MLA Michael Ferguson. The renaming ceremony took place in the presence of the Ferguson family on the Thursday, 25 September, the second anniversary of the Sinn Féin Assembly member’s death.

References

1953 births
2006 deaths
Date of birth missing
Sinn Féin MLAs
Northern Ireland MLAs 2003–2007
Deaths from testicular cancer
Deaths from cancer in Northern Ireland
Alumni of Queen's University Belfast
People from Lisburn
Sinn Féin councillors in Northern Ireland
Members of Lisburn City Council
Irish National Liberation Army members
Hostage taking in the United Kingdom
People convicted of kidnapping
People convicted of robbery
Bank robbers